Below are the rosters for the 2007 South American Youth Championship tournament in Paraguay.

Players name marked in bold have been capped at full international level.

Argentina
Coach: Hugo Tocalli

Bolivia
Coach: Óscar Villegas

Brazil
Coach: Nélson Rodrigues

Chile
Coach: José Sulantay

Colombia
Coach: Eduardo Lara

Ecuador
Coach: Iván Romero

Paraguay
Coach: Ernesto Mastrángelo

Peru
Coach: José Luis Pavoni 
{| style=border-collapse:collapse border=1 cellspacing=0 cellpadding=2 width=600
|-
!bgcolor="#DDDDFF" width="5%"|
 # 
!bgcolor="#DDDDFF" width="25%"|
Name
!bgcolor="#DDDDFF" width="10%"|
Pos
!bgcolor="#DDDDFF" width="15%"|
DOB
!bgcolor="#DDDDFF" width="45%"|
Club
|-
|align=right|1||Daniel Reyes||align=center|GK||align=center|12-12-1987||Alianza Lima 
|-
|align=right|2||Cristian Ramos||align=center|DF||align=center|04-11-1988||Sporting Cristal 
|-
|align=right|3||Jaime Huerta||align=center|DF||align=center|08-08-1987||Alianza Lima 
|-
|align=right|4||Christian Laura||align=center|DF||align=center|13-02-1988||Sporting Cristal 
|-
|align=right|5||Kerwin Peixoto||align=center|MF||align=center|21-02-1988||Alianza Lima 
|-
|align=right|6||Gianfranco Espejo||align=center|DF||align=center|04-03-1988||Sporting Cristal 
|-
|align=right|7||José Mesarina||align=center|MF||align=center|15-11-1988||Alianza Lima 
|-
|align=right|8||Nelinho Quina||align=center|MF||align=center|11-05-1987||Sporting Cristal 
|-
|align=right|9||Orlando Allende||align=center|FW||align=center|09-01-1988||Sporting Cristal 
|-
|align=right|10||Carlos Elías||align=center|MF||align=center|23-03-1988||Alianza Lima 
|-
|align=right|11||Juan Quiñónez||align=center|FW||align=center|14-06-1987||Sport Boys 
|-
|align=right|12||Gianfranco Castellanos||align=center|GK||align=center|08-04-1988||Sporting Cristal 
|-
|align=right|13||Carlos Zambrano||align=center|DF||align=center|10-07-1989||Schalke 04 
|-
|align=right|14||Jesús Rey||align=center|DF||align=center|09-02-1988||Universitario 
|-
|align=right|15||Miguel Cárdenas||align=center|MF||align=center|31-05-1988||Alianza Lima 
|-
|align=right|16||Carlos Flores Córdova||align=center|FW||align=center|09-05-1988||Alianza Lima 
|-
|align=right|17||Damián Ismodes||align=center|MF||align=center|10-03-1989||Sporting Cristal 
|-
|align=right|18||Jeickson Reyes||align=center|FW||align=center|09-10-1987||Alianza Lima 
|-
|align=right|19||Josepmir Ballón||align=center|MF||align=center|21-03-1988||Academia Deportiva Cantolao 
|-
|align=right|20||Enzo Castillo||align=center|FW||align=center|09-01-1987||Sporting Cristal 
|}

UruguayCoach: Gustavo Ferrín 

VenezuelaCoach''': Nelson Carrero

References

South American U-20 Championship squads